The 2003 Sports Network Cup was a college football postseason NCAA Division I FCS Mid-Major Championship Series. The Duquesne Dukes finished ahead of San Diego Toreros 12-6 in first places votes to be named the NCAA Division I FCS Mid-Major Football National Champions.

Dropped Out: None.
Others receiving votes (in order of points, minimum of five required): Iona.

See also
NCAA Division I FCS Consensus Mid-Major Football National Championship

External links
https://web.archive.org/web/20110622082425/http://www.sportsnetwork.com/merge/tsnform.aspx?c=sportsnetwork&page=cfoot2%2Fmisc%2FTSNcup.htm
https://web.archive.org/web/20040607015153/http://www.sportsnetwork.com/default.asp?c=sportsnetwork&page=cfoot2%2Fmisc%2FTSN-MID-MAJOR.htm

College football championship trophies